The highest-selling albums and EPs in the United States are ranked in the Billboard 200, published by Billboard magazine. The data are compiled by Nielsen Soundscan based on each album's weekly physical and digital sales. In 2005, 34 albums advanced to the peak position in 53 issues of the magazine.

Mariah Carey's comeback album, The Emancipation of Mimi, sold the most copies in the United States, accumulating 4.866 million units in sale by the end of 2005. She became the first female recording artist to have topped the year-end chart since Alanis Morissette's Jagged Little Pill in 1996. The Emancipation of Mimi is Carey's first chart topper since she reached the summit of the Billboard 200 in 1997 with Butterfly. 50 Cent's The Massacre sold a total of 4.834 million units, only 32,000 copies behind The Emancipation of Mimi, becoming the second best-selling album of the year.

The Massacre spent six consecutive weeks atop the Billboard 200, making it the longest-running number-one album of 2005. The album sold 1.14 million copies in its debut week, the biggest first-week figure in 2005. Coldplay's X&Y stayed at the top for three straight weeks; it gave the band their first number-one album. Coldplay is the only non-American act to have topped the Billboard 200 for an extended chart run since Shania Twain had a five-week reign with Up!, and the only British act with the longest stay at number one since The Beatles in 2000–2001.

2Pac's Loyal to the Game reached the top spot in the first issue of the chart, making it his third posthumous number-one album and his fifth chart topper. Another posthumous chart topper was Ray Charles' Genius Loves Company, which was released three months after his death. The album won Album of the Year at the 2005 Grammy Awards, spurring massive increase of sales. This gave Charles his first number-one album in more than four decades of his career.

Chart history

See also
2005 in music
List of number-one albums (United States)

References

United States Albums
2005